Konstantinos Gouvelis was an Ottoman-era magnate and politician who took part in the  Greek War of Independence. 

Hailing from Karpenisi, Konstantinos Gouvelis was the brother of the armatolos Dimitrios Gouvelis. Highly educated and very wealthy, during the final years of Ottoman rule in Greece, Konstantinos Gouvelis served as principal secretary to Veli Pasha, son of the powerful Ali Pasha of Yanina, and entered the Filiki Etaireia. 

When the Greek War of Independence broke out, Gouvelis moved to Missolonghi, donating his entire fortune to the war effort. He was elected as a representative to the Third National Assembly at Troezen, and died in 1829 at Nafplio.

He was the grandfather of the Greek general Konstantinos Gouvelis.

References

1780 births
1829 deaths
19th-century Greek people
People from Karpenisi
Greek people of the Greek War of Independence